Glen Alan Phillips (born 22 November 1982) in Farnborough, Kent, is a former motorcycle speedway rider from England.

Career
In 2015, Phillips was part of the British team with Richard Hall, Andrew Appleton and James Shanes that won the world championship gold medal at the 2015 Team Long Track World Championship. It was the first time that Britain had won the event. 

He has represented Great Britain at Under-21 level.

Major results

World Longtrack Championship

Grand-Prix Years

 2003 - Reserve (Non-Starter)
 2004 - Four G.P. 22pts (17th)
 2006 - Three G.P. 33pts (7th)
 2007 - Three G.P. 11pts (17th)
 2008 - Four G.P. 66pts (Second)
 2009 - Five G.P. 76pts (5th)
 2010 - Six G.P. 62pts (10th)
 2011 - Six G.P. 53pts (12th)
 2012 - Six G.P. 70pts (10th)
 2013 - Six G.P. 46pts (16th)
 2014 - One G.P. 10pts (18th)
 2015 - Four G.P. 29pts (11th)
 2016 - five G.P. 46pts (8th)

Best G.P. Results

First

 2009 -   Morizes

Second

 2008 -   Morizes

Third

 2008 -   Marianske Lanze
 2008 -   Vechta

World Longtrack Team Championship

 2007 -   Morizes (with Paul Hurry, Andrew Appleton & Mitch Godden) Second
 2008 -   Werlte (with Richard Hall, Mitch Godden & Vince Kinchin) Third
 2009 -   Eenrum (with Paul Hurry, Andrew Appleton & Richard Hall) Fourth
 2010 -   Morizes (with Andrew Appleton, Richard Hall & Chris Mills) Fourth
 2011 -   Scheeßel (with Paul Cooper, Andrew Appleton & Mitch Godden) Third
 2012 -   St. Macaire (with Paul Cooper, Richard Hall & David Howe) Second
 2013 -   Folkestone (with Richard Hall, Andrew Appleton & Paul Cooper) Third
 2014 -   Forssa (with Andrew Appleton, Richard Hall & David Howe) Fifth
 2015 -   Muhldorf (with Andrew Appleton, Richard Hall & James Shanes) First
 2016 -   Mariánské Lázně (with Andrew Appleton, Richard Hall & James Shanes) 4th

European Grasstrack Championship

Finalist

 2005 -   Schwarme 12pts (5th)
 2006 -   La Reole 11pts (7th)
 2007 -   Folkestone 15pts (4th)
 2008 -   Siddeburen 15pts (5th)
 2009 -   Berghaupten 17pts (Third)
 2010 -   La Reole (Reserve Non-Starter)
 2011 -   Skegness 10pts (4th)
 2012 -   Eenrum 15pts (5th)
 2013 -   Bielefeld 1pt (17th) Reserve
 2014 -   St. Macaire (Reserve Non-Starter)

Best Other Results

Semi-final

Second

 2006 -   Folkestone
 2007 -   Hertingan

Third

 2012 -   Artigues de Lussac

British Grasstrack Championship

Masters

First

 2007 -  @ Long Marston

Second
 2011 -  @ Rhodes Minnis

Third
 2008 -  @ Rhodes Minnis
 2012 -  @ Frittenden

Other Top Ten Finishes

 2000 -  @ Folkestone
 2002 -  @ Skegness
 2005 -  @ Northiam
 2006 -  @ Wadebridge
 2013 -  @ Wimborne
 2015 -  @ Wimborne

References

1982 births
Living people
British speedway riders
English motorcycle racers
Reading Racers riders
Isle of Wight Islanders riders
King's Lynn Stars riders
Individual Speedway Long Track World Championship riders